Neolamprologus is a genus of cichlids endemic to eastern Africa with all but one species, Neolamprologus devosi from the Malagarasi River, occurring in Lake Tanganyika. It is the largest genus of cichlids in Lake Tanganyika and also the largest genus in the tribe Lamprologini, which includes Altolamprologus, Chalinochromis, Julidochromis,  Lamprologus, Lepidiolamprologus, Telmatochromis and Variabilichromis. The latter is a monotypic genus doubtfully distinct from Neolamprologus.

It is already known for some time that according to mtDNA sequence analysis, this genus is very probably polyphyletic. It is likely that it will be revised eventually; if Variabilichromis is split off, at least some of the more ancient lineages currently placed in Neolamprologus are probably worthy of separation also. However, the morphological similarity and numerous undescribed species do not make analyses easier, and as with many cichlids, recent speciation and abundant hybridization seriously confound molecular studies to the point where single-gene studies or those using only mtDNA or nDNA are essentially worthless for resolving Lamprologini phylogeny.

While lineages are clearly different in their morphology, habits and ecology, gene flow between genera and species is common enough due to extremely low postzygotic isolation. Males of Neolamprologus apparently have always readily and successfully mated with females of other Lamprologini they found ready to spawn: mtDNA lineages similar to other Lamprologini genera are widely encountered in species placed in Neolamprologus. And not only do such hybrids seem to be fertile at least to a limited extent in many cases, new species often appear to originate from such interbreeding.

Species
There are currently 46 recognized species in this genus:

 Neolamprologus bifasciatus Büscher, 1993
 Neolamprologus boulengeri Steindachner, 1909
 Neolamprologus brevis Boulenger, 1899
 Neolamprologus brichardi Poll, 1974
 Neolamprologus buescheri Staeck, 1983
 Neolamprologus cancellatus Aibara, T. Takahashi & Nakaya, 2005
 Neolamprologus caudopunctatus Poll, 1978
 Neolamprologus chitamwebwai Verburg & I. R. Bills, 2007
 Neolamprologus christyi Trewavas & Poll, 1952
 Neolamprologus crassus Brichard, 1989
 Neolamprologus cylindricus Staeck & Seegers, 1986
 Neolamprologus devosi Schelly, Stiassny & Seegers, 2003
 Neolamprologus falcicula Brichard, 1989
 Neolamprologus fasciatus Boulenger, 1898
 Neolamprologus furcifer Boulenger, 1898
 Neolamprologus gracilis Brichard, 1989
 Neolamprologus helianthus Büscher, 1997
 Neolamprologus leleupi Poll, 1956
 Neolamprologus leloupi Poll, 1948
 Neolamprologus longicaudatus Nakaya & Gashagaza, 1995
 Neolamprologus longior Staeck, 1980
 Neolamprologus marunguensis Büscher, 1989
 Neolamprologus modestus Boulenger, 1898
 Neolamprologus mondabu Boulenger, 1906
 Neolamprologus multifasciatus Boulenger, 1906
 Neolamprologus mustax Poll, 1978
 Neolamprologus niger Poll, 1956
 Neolamprologus nigriventris Büscher, 1992
 Neolamprologus obscurus Poll, 1978
 Neolamprologus olivaceous Brichard, 1989
 Neolamprologus pectoralis Büscher, 1991
 Neolamprologus petricola Poll, 1949
 Neolamprologus pleuromaculatus Trewavas & Poll, 1952
 Neolamprologus prochilus R. M. Bailey & D. J. Stewart, 1977
 Neolamprologus pulcher Trewavas & Poll, 1952
 Neolamprologus savoryi Poll, 1949
 Neolamprologus schreyeni Poll, 1974
 Neolamprologus sexfasciatus Trewavas & Poll, 1952
 Neolamprologus similis Büscher, 1992
 Neolamprologus splendens Brichard, 1989
 Neolamprologus tetracanthus Boulenger, 1899 (Fourspine cichlid)
 Neolamprologus timidus S. O. Kullander, Norén, Mi. Karlsson & Ma. Karlsson, 2014 
 Neolamprologus toae Poll, 1949
 Neolamprologus tretocephalus Boulenger, 1899
 Neolamprologus variostigma Büscher, 1995
 Neolamprologus ventralis Büscher, 1995
 Neolamprologus walteri Verburg & I. R. Bills, 2007
 Neolamprologus wauthioni Poll, 1949

Footnotes

References

  (2007): Phylogenetic relationships of the Lake Tanganyika cichlid tribe Lamprologini: The story from mitochondrial DNA. Mol. Phylogenet. Evol. 45(2): 629–642.  (HTML abstract)
  (1998): Tanganyikan cichlids in their natural habitat. Cichlid Press.
  (2003): Neolamprologus pulcher "Daffodil II". Fincinnati 2003. PDF fulltext
  (1994): Mitochondrial phylogeny of the Lamprologini, the major substrate spawning lineage of cichild fishes from Lake Tanganyika in eastern Africa. Mol. Biol. Evol. 11(4): 691-703. PDF fulltext

 
Lamprologini

Cichlid genera